Helena Chan Rui Ying (born 6 July 1989) is a Hong Kong-Swedish Channel V presenter and fashion model. She is of Chinese and Swedish descent. She is best known for representing Hong Kong in the first season of Asia's Next Top Model. She is the current host of STAR World's Style Setter. Helena is a keen shark fin activist. As a top model, she has graced the pages of top fashion magazines, including Harper's Bazaar, Esquire, Baccarat Magazine, and MRMagazine. She is currently working on her own fashion line.

Early life
Chan is a kindergarten teacher in Hong Kong, where she was raised for thirteen years, and currently works as a freelance model. She began her modeling career at the age of fifteen. She attended King George V School (Hong Kong). Before signing to Elite Model Management, she was turned down by various modeling agencies. After being encouraged by her friends, she applied for the first season of Asia's Next Top Model, representing Hong Kong, where she was evicted for her bad temper after making it to the top six. After participating on AsNTM she enjoyed a successful career as a celebrity in Hong Kong. Among her top model campaigns are an Inniu campaign and a fashion spread in Harper's Bazaar. She was inspired by supermodels like Cara Delevingne and fashion designer Roberto Cavalli.

Filmography

References

 

1989 births
Hong Kong people of Swedish descent
Hong Kong female models
Swedish female models
Swedish people of Hong Kong descent
Living people
Top Model contestants
Alumni of King George V School, Hong Kong